Joseph William Lawson (1844 - 16 April 1920) was an organist and composer based in England.

Life

Joseph was born in 1844 in Bristol, Gloucestershire, England, the son of Joseph Lawson and Elizabeth Saunders. When Joseph's mother died when he was about 13 years old, his father remarried Elizabeth Davey, who continued to parent Joseph. The 1861 census for England records that Joseph was a commercial clerk, like his father. By the time of the 1871 census Joseph was a professional musician.

Joseph married twice:
Firstly Joseph married in 1870 Jane Swallow, who died in 1875. The children from this marriage were:
Marion Lawson (b. 1871)
Blanche Lawson (b. 1873)
Jane Lawson (b. 1875)
Joseph married secondly in 1880 Ellen Eliza Brightman . The children of this marriage were:
Winifred Lawson (b. 1881)
Gertrude Lawson (b. 1882)
Hilda Lawson (b. 1884)
Archibald Stainer Lawson (1885 - 1970)
Mildrid Lawson (b. 1886)
Donald Claxton Lawson (1888-1973)
Ida Lawson (b. 1893)
Cecil Vaughan Lawson (b. 1896)
Basil Lawson (1897-1907)

Appointments

Organist of St Mary Redcliffe 1862 - 1906

Compositions

He composed a set of evening canticles. The Nunc Dimittis was sung at his funeral.

References

1844 births
1920 deaths
English organists
British male organists
English composers